Widemann is a German surname. Notable people with the surname include:

 Hermann A. Widemann, German businessman and Kingdom of Hawaii cabinet member
 Walter Widemann, Swiss fencer

See also
 20606 Widemann, a main-belt minor planet
 Wiedemann

German-language surnames